Jean-Baptiste-Charles Chabroud (5 March 1750 in Vienne, Isère – 1 February 1816 in Paris), better known as Charles Chabroud, was a French lawyer and politician.

Biography
Chabroud worked as a lawyer in Vienne, Isère. On January 4, 1789, he was elected to the Estates General by the province of Dauphiné.

He was in charge of the report of the file processed by the Châtelet upon the events of October 5th and 6th. The Duke of Orléans and the Count of Mirabeau were implicated by the report, but were exonerated by the National Constituent Assembly after a vivid discussion.

On April 9, 1790, Chabroud was called to the presidency of the Constituent Assembly.

On March 4, 1791, he was named a deputy to the Court of Cassation for the Isère department. He sat in the Court of Cassation until Year V, then he moved to Paris and became a consulting lawyer in the Court of Cassation, the Cour des prises and the Council of State on July 8, 1806.

Published works
 Opinions sur quelques questions relatives à l'ordre judiciaire (1790)
 Rapport sur la procédure du Châtelet sur l'affaire des 5 et 6 octobre (1790)

See also
 List of presidents of the National Assembly of France

Bibliography

External links

 

1750 births
1816 deaths
Politicians from Vienne, Isère
Members of the National Constituent Assembly (France)
18th-century French lawyers
19th-century French lawyers